Richard "Molly" Schauffele (26 January 1903 in Cannstatt – 5 February 1983 in Stuttgart) was a German track athlete, soccer player, politician and sports personality.

Life 
In his youth up to his mid-twenties the civil engineer by trade played soccer for the VfB Stuttgart. At the age of 25, Schauffele switched over to track & field and never looked back.

From 1919 to 1927 Schauffele played soccer on the first squad of the VfB Stuttgart. 1927 Schauffele won the Southern German championship title with the VfB Stuttgart. However, the team failed to reach the finals for the German championships.

1927 marked the end of Schauffele's soccer career, who from hereon forward focused on developing his talents in the throwing disciplines of track and field. At a height of 6'8" Schauffele was a giant of his time and an exceptionally gifted athlete.
He successfully competed in national championships up to the age of 40 and was able to garner 32 state and regional championship titles in discus, javelin, shot-put and ball throwing (now no longer a competitive discipline). In 1935 Schauffele's efforts were rewarded when winning the German national team title with the Stuttgarter Kickers.

Schauffele's great-grandson, Xander, won the gold medal in men's golf at the 2020 Tokyo Summer Olympics in 2021.

Positions and responsibilities 
 From 1948 to 1950 Schauffele was president of the Stuttgarter Kickers.
 In the years 1951–1954, as well as 1959–1965 Schauffele was a founding member, chairman and president of the Wuerttemberg Athletic Federation (WLV). 
 Beginning in 1954 up until his death in 1983 Schauffele held the title of "honorary president" of the WLV. Schauffele was instrumental in installing the first tartan track in Germany in the Stuttgart Stadium, thus attracting large international track and field competitions to Stuttgart.
 In 1959 Schauffele was elected to the Stuttgart city council, where under the city's legendary lord mayor Arnulf Klett he was acting vice mayor.

Achievements in sports 
 1927 Southern German soccer champion with the VfB Stuttgart
 1935 German Track and field team champion with the Stuttgarter Kickers
 32x track and field titles in shot-put, discus, javelin and ball throw
 1936 head judge for all track and field throwing disciplines at the Olympic games in Berlin

Accolades 
 1950 German Athletics Association (DLV) "Pin of honor" in Gold
 1965 German Athletics Association (DLV) "Hanns Braun Memorial Prize"
 1970 German Athletics Association (DLV) "Ring of honor"
 1976 Distinguished Service Order of the state Baden-Württemberg
 honorary naming of the Olympic training center Stuttgart to "Molly Schauffele Sporthalle"

See also 
 Cannstatt Travertin Quarry
 Xander Schauffele

References

German footballers
VfB Stuttgart players
Stuttgarter Kickers players
German city councillors
Recipients of the Order of Merit of Baden-Württemberg
1903 births
1983 deaths
Association football forwards